SA Athletics Stadium is a comprehensive, modern athletics facility. Located only a few minutes drive from the Adelaide CBD, the athletics facility offers a national standard nine lane running track and field complex including training and warm-up areas, lighting, photo finish and modern timing equipment. The infield converts to a FIFA regulation sized quality turf pitch for soccer and other turf related sports. The stadium was formerly known as Santos Stadium under a sponsorship arrangement with Santos Limited.

SA Athletics Stadium is owned and operated by the Office for Recreation, Sport and Racing, an agency of the Government of South Australia.

Opened on Australia Day, 1998, it replaced the Olympic Sports Field in Kensington as Adelaide's premier athletics venue, and has seating for 1,200 and a maximum capacity of 6,000. The track surface is Rekortan M99.

The stadium is located on the edge of the CBD, in the Adelaide Parklands adjacent to Priceline Stadium, Adelaide's largest netball complex. The Stadium is home to Athletics South Australia, the South Australia Athletics League, City Bay Fun Run, the South Australian Little Athletics Association, and is regularly used by schools for sporting carnivals.

References

Athletics (track and field) venues in Australia
1998 establishments in Australia
Sports venues in Adelaide
Sports venues completed in 1998